Nauvdip Kumar Sodhi was an Indian judge who served as Chief Justice of the Kerala and Karnataka High Courts. He also served as the Presiding Officer of the Securities Appellate Tribunal.

Career
Sodhi graduated in law from Panjab University in 1965 and started practicing as an advocate in civil, constitutional, labour, tax, transport and corporate laws in Chandigarh. He also served as editor of the Indian Law Reports (Punjab and Haryana series) and was a part-time law faculty at the Panjab University. In March 1991 he was elevated as Judge of the Punjab and Haryana High Court, later transferred to Kerala High Court where he served as acting Chief Justice and became Chief Justice of the Kerala High Court and was transferred to Karnataka as Chief Justice from where Justice Sodhi demitted his office upon attaining age of superannuation on 29 November 2005. After retirement he was appointed as the Presiding Officer of the Securities Appellate Tribunal at Mumbai, for a period of six years.

Death
After he contracted COVID-19, he developed acute respiratory distress syndrome and was moved to the Post Graduate Institute of Medical Education and Research in Chandigarh. He succumbed to COVID-19, on 28 December 2021, at the age of 78.

References

1943 births
2021 deaths
Indian judges
Judges of the Punjab and Haryana High Court
Chief Justices of the Kerala High Court
20th-century Indian judges
Chief Justices of the Karnataka High Court
Deaths from the COVID-19 pandemic in India